João Pedro Ramos Borges Sousa (born 4 August 1971) is a Portuguese football manager. He is the current manager of Portuguese Primeira Liga club Famalicão.

After working as an assistant to Marco Silva, he managed in his own right in the Primeira Liga at Famalicão and Boavista.

Coaching career

Assistant
Sousa was the long-term assistant manager of Marco Silva from 2012 to 2019, who was his former teammate at Trofense. He was the assistant manager to Silva at Primeira Liga clubs Estoril and Sporting, as well as Olympiacos of Super League Greece and English  Premier League trio Hull City, Watford, and Everton.

Famalicão
Sousa became the coach of Famalicão on 31 May 2019, signing a two-year deal at a team who had just achieved promotion to the Primeira Liga for the first time in 25 years. In the first month of the season, he was voted Manager of the Month for winning three and drawing one of the four fixtures. He retained the honour for September with the team from Vila Nova de Famalicão still unbeaten; he earned 56.16% of the votes.

Sousa's team spent much of 2019–20 in contention for European qualification, but missed out to Rio Ave on the last day. In the Taça de Portugal campaign, they reached the semi-finals for the first time but were eliminated 4–3 on aggregate by Benfica. He was dismissed on 31 January 2021, with Famalicão one place above relegation.

Boavista
On 28 June 2021, Sousa replaced Jesualdo Ferreira as manager of Boavista on a two-year contract. He left on 30 November with the club in 11th, saying that he had received a superior offer from Al-Raed in the Saudi Professional League.

Al-Raed
Sousa was hired by Al-Raed on 26 January 2022, replacing Spanish manager Pablo Machín. Having won once in eight games, he was suspended and dismissed in late May with two games remaining, for having criticised his players for missing training; he then complained to FIFA.

Return to Famalicão
On 22 September 2022, Sousa returned to 16th-placed Famalicão.

Managerial statistics

References

External links
 ZeroZero Profile
 ForaDeJogo manager profile
 FDB Profile

1971 births
Living people
Footballers from Luanda
Portuguese footballers
Portuguese football managers
Angolan footballers
Angolan football managers
Angolan people of Portuguese descent
Association football forwards
Primeira Liga players
Liga Portugal 2 players
Saudi Professional League managers
S.C. Braga players
G.D. Chaves players
Rio Ave F.C. players
C.D. Trofense players
Primeira Liga managers
F.C. Famalicão managers
Boavista F.C. managers
Al-Raed FC managers
Portuguese expatriates in England
Expatriate football managers in Saudi Arabia
Portuguese expatriate sportspeople in Saudi Arabia